Roland Liboton (born 6 March 1957) is a Belgian former cyclo-cross racer. Liboton won the UCI Cyclo-cross World Championships in 1980, 1982, 1983, and 1984, was the Belgian national champion for ten successive years from 1980 to 1989. He also won the Superprestige in 1985, 1986 and 1988. Liboton also occasionally competed in road races, having ridden in the 1981 Tour de France. He retired from professional competition in 1992.

In 2002, Roland Liboton was introduced in the UCI Cycling Hall of Fame

Major results

Road 

1977
2nd Druivencross Overijse
1978
 1st  National CX Championships Amateurs
1st Druivencross Overijse
1979
2nd Druivencross Overijse
3rd Superprestige Diegem
1980
 1st  UCI World CX Championships
 1st  National CX Championships
 1st Jaarmarktcross Niel
 1st Superprestige Diegem
 1st Druivencross Overijse
 1st Trofeo Mamma & Papà Guerciotti
1981
 1st  National CX Championships
 1st Druivencross Overijse
 2nd  UCI CX World Championships
 3rd Superprestige Diegem
1982
 1st  UCI World CX Championships
 1st  National CX Championships
 1st Jaarmarktcross Niel
 1st Superprestige Diegem
 1st Druivencross Overijse
 3rd Duinencross Koksijde
1983
 1st  UCI World CX Championships
 1st  National CX Championships
 1st Jaarmarktcross Niel
 1st Superprestige Diegem
 1st Druivencross Overijse
 1st Cyclocross Valkenswaard
 1st Radquer Steinmaur
1984
 1st  UCI World CX Championships
 1st  National CX Championships
 1st Azencross Loenhout
  1st Superprestige Diegem
 1st Cyclo-cross Gavere
 1st Druivencross Overijse
 1st Trofeo Mamma & Papà Guerciotti
 1st Cyclocross Roma
 1st Cyclocross Oss
 1st Cyclocross Zillebeke
 2nd Cyclocross Zürich-Waid
 2nd Cyclocross Valkenswaard
1985 
 1st  National CX Championships
 1st Azencross Loenhout
 1st Jaarmarktcross Niel
 1st Superprestige Diegem
 1st Druivencross Overijse
 1st Superprestige Gieten
 1st Trofeo Mamma & Papà Guerciotti
 1st Duinencross Koksijde
 1st Cyclo-cross Superprestige 1984-85
 2nd Cyclocross Oss
 3rd Cyclocross Valkenswaard
1986
 1st  National CX Championships
 1st Superprestige Diegem
 1st Druivencross Overijse
 1st Cyclo-cross Superprestige 1985-86
 1st Duinencross Koksijde
 2nd Jaarmarktcross Niel
 2nd Cyclo-cross Gavere
 2nd Cyclocross Zillebeke
1987
 1st  National CX Championships
 1st Jaarmarktcross Niel
 1st Superprestige Diegem
 1st Druivencross Overijse
 1st Superprestige Gieten
 1st Cyclocross Rijkevorsel
 1st Cyclocross Zarautz
 1st Cyclocross Roma
 2nd Cyclocross Oss
1988
 1st  National CX Championships
 1st Superprestige Diegem
 1st Cyclo-cross Gavere
 1st Cyclocross Wetzikon
 1st Cyclocross Zillebeke
 1st Cyclocross Azencross Loenhout
 1st Cyclo-cross Superprestige 1987-88
 2nd Jaarmarktcross Niel
1989
 1st Cyclocross Harnes
1990
 1st  National CX Championships
 1st Cyclocross Essen
 2nd Druivencross Overijse

References

External links

Roland Liboton bio at UCI Cyclo-cross World Championships
Guerciotti Team

1957 births
Living people
Belgian male cyclists
Cyclo-cross cyclists
Sportspeople from Leuven
Cyclists from Flemish Brabant
UCI Cyclo-cross World Champions (men)
Belgian cyclo-cross champions